Sarah Elizabeth Dunsworth-Nickerson (born January 25, 1976) is a Canadian actress who plays the character of Sarah in the Canadian television franchise Trailer Park Boys.  She is the real-life daughter of the late John Dunsworth, the actor who played Jim Lahey.  She additionally appeared in Beefcake and the shorts The Bridge and Treevenge.

Dunsworth-Nickerson is also a costume designer, on Trailer Park Boys and projects such as Hobo with a Shotgun (in which her sister Molly Dunsworth co-stars with Rutger Hauer), and has worked in film and television in several other capacities, including production design, casting, and as an assistant director.

References

External links

Canadian film actresses
Canadian television actresses
Living people
Actresses from Halifax, Nova Scotia
1976 births